Pescatore (Italian for "fisher" or "fisherman") is a surname that may refer to:

 Antoine Pescatore (1787–1858), Luxembourgian businessman and politician
 Enrico Pescatore or Henry, Count of Malta (fl. 13th century), Genoese adventurer, privateer and pirate
  (born 1862), member of the Council of State of Luxembourg
 Fred Pescatore, American author, medical commentator and internist
 Jean-Pierre Pescatore (1793–1855), Luxembourgish-French businessman, banker, art collector, and philanthropist
 John Pescatore (born 1964), American rower
 Théodore Pescatore (1802–1878), Luxembourgian politician

 Pierre Pescatore (1919–2010), Luxembourgian judge
 Adeline Pescatore (1926–2018), Italian-American fashionista and at-home comedienne.

See also
 Pescatore (disambiguation)

Italian-language surnames
Occupational surnames